The University of Cambridge Chancellor election, 1811 was an election for the post of Chancellor of Cambridge University. The election was triggered by the death of the previous incumbent, Augustus FitzRoy, 3rd Duke of Grafton, and it was the first contested election for the post since 1748.

There were two candidates for the post: His Highness Prince William, Duke of Gloucester and Edinburgh, and John Manners, 5th Duke of Rutland.

Election
The result was as follows:

See also
 List of chancellors of the University of Cambridge

References
Elisabeth Leedham-Green, A Concise History of the University of Cambridge (Cambridge University Press, Cambridge, 1996) pp. 146–8

1811
1811 elections in the United Kingdom
1811 in England
Non-partisan elections